Chiwan station is the southwest terminal metro station on Line 2 of the Shenzhen Metro. It opened on 28 December 2010. The Line 5 platforms opened on 28 September 2019.

Station layout

Exits

References

External links
 Shenzhen Metro Chiwan station (Chinese)
 Shenzhen Metro Chiwan station (English)

Shenzhen Metro stations
Railway stations in Guangdong
Nanshan District, Shenzhen
Railway stations in China opened in 2010